Francisco Joaquín Pérez Rufete (born 20 November 1976) is a Spanish former footballer, and a manager. He played predominantly as a right winger with good dribbling ability, also being a player with a good workrate.

During his professional career he played with seven clubs, including Barcelona (one game) and Valencia (two La Liga titles).

Over 12 seasons, Rufete amassed Spanish top division totals of 269 matches and 23 goals.

Playing career

Club
Born in Benejúzar, Province of Alicante, Valencian Community, Rufete was a product of FC Barcelona's youth system. He appeared once for the first team, in 1995–96's final round, a 2–2 away draw against Deportivo de La Coruña on 26 May 1996, and his first full professional season came in 1997–98, with Segunda División club CD Toledo.

After having started the 1998–99 campaign with RCD Mallorca (no appearances), he moved in January 1999 to Málaga CF, being instrumental, alongside Catanha and José María Movilla, in the side's promotion to La Liga (Málaga was in Segunda División B in the previous season).

After two exceptional individual seasons, Rufete moved to Valencia CF. Although not an undisputed starter after his first year, he contributed with good overall performances and, on 14 March 2004, he scored twice at RC Celta de Vigo (2–0) as the Che went on to win another domestic title.

After Quique Sánchez Flores arrived at Valencia from Getafe CF, Rufete was released and joined RCD Espanyol on a free transfer in July 2006. He was constantly hampered by injuries during the 2007–08 campaign, after having appeared in 11 UEFA Cup matches during the Catalans' run to the final in 2007.

In mid-July 2009, Rufete was released by Espanyol, moving close to home with Hércules CF in a two-year deal. In his first season, aged 32/33, the veteran contributed with nearly 2,000 minutes as the Alicante team returned to the top division after an absence of 13 years.

International
Rufete received three caps with the Spain national team in 2000, the first being in a 2–0 friendly win over Italy on 29 March in Barcelona. He came on as a substitute for Joseba Etxeberria at the hour-mark.

Coaching career
Rufete was released by Hércules in late 2011 after the club decided not to renew his contract, and retired from football shortly after. Two years later he returned to Valencia after being appointed youth coordinator, but switched to director of football after a few months.

On 18 April 2018, Rufete was given his first managerial position at UD Ibiza of the Tercera División. His team missed out on promotion with a penalty shootout defeat to Atlético Levante UD in the play-off final on 24 June.

Rufete returned to Espanyol as sporting director, and became their interim manager on 27 June 2020 when Abelardo Fernández was sacked from the last-placed club with six games to go. The next day, in his first professional game in charge, his side lost by a single goal at home to Real Madrid; he oversaw their first fall from the top flight since 1993.

Personal life
Rufete's son, Fran Pérez, is also a professional footballer.

Managerial statistics

Honours

Club
Valencia
La Liga: 2001–02, 2003–04
UEFA Cup: 2003–04
UEFA Super Cup: 2004

Espanyol
UEFA Cup runner-up: 2006–07

International
Spain U18
UEFA European Under-18 Championship: 1995

References

External links

CiberChe stats and bio 

1976 births
Living people
People from Vega Baja del Segura
Sportspeople from the Province of Alicante
Spanish footballers
Footballers from the Valencian Community
Association football wingers
La Liga players
Segunda División players
Segunda División B players
FC Barcelona C players
FC Barcelona Atlètic players
FC Barcelona players
CD Toledo players
RCD Mallorca players
Málaga CF players
Valencia CF players
UEFA Cup winning players
RCD Espanyol footballers
Hércules CF players
Spain youth international footballers
Spain international footballers
Spanish football managers
La Liga managers
Tercera División managers
UD Ibiza managers
RCD Espanyol managers